The 1946 All-Pacific Coast football team consists of American football players chosen by various organizations for All-Pacific Coast teams for the 1946 college football season. The organizations selecting teams in 1946 included the Associated Press (AP) and the United Press (UP).

The UCLA Bruins won the Pacific Coast Conference (PCC) championship with a 10–1 record, finished the season ranked #4 in the final AP Poll, and had four first-team players: quarterback Ernie Case (AP, UP), end Burr Baldwin (AP, UP), tackle Don Malmberg (AP, UP), and center/linebacker Don Paul (AP, UP).

Despite finishing second in the PCC with a 7–1–1 record, Oregon State did not land any player on the first teams selected by either the AP or the UP. USC, Stanford and Washington finished in third, fourth and fifth place in the PCC, and each placed two players on the first team.

Three players from teams outside the PCC received first-team honors, They were St. Mary's Gaels halfback Herman Wedemeyer (AP, UP), who was later inducted into the College Football Hall of Fame, San Francisco Dons halfback Forest Hall (AP, UP), and Nevada end Horace Gillom (UP).

All-Pacific Coast selections

Quarterbacks
 Ernie Case, UCLA (AP-1; UP-1)

Halfbacks
 Herman Wedemeyer, St. Mary's (AP-1; UP-1) (College Football Hall of Fame)
 Forrest Hall, Univ. of San Francisco (AP-1; UP-1)

Fullbacks
 Lloyd Merriman, Stanford (AP-1; UP-1)

Ends
 Burr Baldwin, UCLA (AP-1; UP-1)
 Dick Hagen, Washington (AP-1)
 Horace Gillom, Nevada (UP-1)

Tackles
 John Ferraro, USC (AP-1; UP-1)
 Don Malmberg, UCLA (AP-1; UP-1)

Guards
 Bill Hachten, Stanford (AP-1; UP-1)
 John Zeger, Washington (UP-1)
 Mike Garzoni, USC (AP-1)

Centers
 Don Paul, UCLA (AP-1; UP-1)

Key

AP = Associated Press

UP = United Press

Bold = Consensus first-team selection of both the AP and UP

See also
1946 College Football All-America Team

References

All-Pacific Coast Football Team
All-Pacific Coast football teams
All-Pac-12 Conference football teams